Trogontherium is an extinct genus of giant beavers, ranging from the Late Pliocene to the Late Pleistocene. It is not closely related to the North American giant beavers of the genus Castoroides. Fossils of Trogontherium have been found across temperate Eurasia, from Western Europe to China. The last record of the taxon is from the Late Pleistocene of Manchuria near Harbin, around 40,000 years old. Its disappearance might be related to the arrival of hunter gatherers into the region. Dental microwear analysis of teeth of C. cuvieri from China, spanning the Pleistocene, suggest that it was ecologically plastic, and able to adapt its diet to local conditions.

See also
 Castoroides

References 

Prehistoric beavers
Pleistocene rodents
Pleistocene genus extinctions
Pleistocene mammals of Europe
Pleistocene mammals of Asia
Prehistoric rodent genera